The Public Works ministers in Belgium are the political ministers responsible for public works.

List of ministers

Flanders
1988-1992 Johan Sauwens (VU)
1992-1995 Theo Kelchtermans (CVP)
1995-1999 Eddy Baldewijns (SP)
1999-2003 Steve Stevaert (SP)
2003-2004 Gilbert Bossuyt (SP.A)
2004-2007 Kris Peeters (CD&V)
2007-2014 Hilde Crevits (CD&V)
2014-2019 Ben Weyts (N-VA)
2019-     Lydia Peeters (Open VLD)

Wallonia

Public Works